Kyo-hwa-so No. 77 Tanchon(77호 단천 교화소) is a "reeducation camp" with ca. 6,000 prisoners near Tanchon in South Hamgyong province, North Korea.

See also 
 Human rights in North Korea
 Kaechon concentration camp

References

External links 
 Committee for Human Rights in North Korea: The Hidden Gulag - Overview of North Korean prison camps with testimonies and satellite photographs

Concentration camps in North Korea